P. colorata  may refer to:
 Pseudowintera colorata, a woody evergreen flowering tree species endemic to New Zealand
 Psychotria colorata, a plant species found in Brazil
 Pterocerina colorata, a picture-winged fly species

See also
 Colorata